Osiek Grodkowski  is a village in the administrative district of Gmina Grodków, within Brzeg County, Opole Voivodeship, in south-western Poland.

External links 
 Jewish Community in Osiek Grodkowski on Virtual Shtetl

References

Villages in Brzeg County